Two Blue Eyes is a 1955 West German romance film directed by Gustav Ucicky and starring Marianne Koch, Claus Holm and Helen Vita.

It was made at the Wandsbek Studios of the Hamburg-based company Real Film. The film's sets were designed by the art directors Albrecht Becker and Herbert Kirchhoff.

Cast
 Marianne Koch as Christiane Neubert
 Claus Holm as Dr. Michael Arndt
 Helen Vita as Vera Seidemann
 Camilla Spira as Frau Friedrich
 Kurt Meisel as Eddi Witt
 Charles Regnier as Hergentheimer, Direktor
 Richard Romanowsky as Carolus, Gärtner
 Ethel Reschke as Erika, Telefonistin
 Ernst von Klipstein as Feigl, Ingenieur
 Richard Münch as Schneider, Ingenieur
 Josef Dahmen as Professor Wittmann
 Albert Florath as Gastwirt
 Margarete Haagen as Oberschwester
 Friedrich Schütter as Werbeleiter "Hanno-Werke"
 Carl Voscherau as Polizist
 Otto Kuhlmann as 1. Bankbeamter
 Peter Frank as 2. Bankbeamter
 Willy Millowitsch as Pförtner
 Horst Beck as Werkmeister
 Gunnar Winkler as Singer

References

Bibliography
 Hans-Michael Bock and Tim Bergfelder. The Concise Cinegraph: An Encyclopedia of German Cinema. Berghahn Books, 2009.

External links 
 

1955 films
1950s romance films
German romance films
West German films
1950s German-language films
Films directed by Gustav Ucicky
Films about blind people
Real Film films
Films shot at Wandsbek Studios
1950s German films